Emilio Ferrera (born 19 June 1967 in Schaerbeek) is a Belgian football manager and former player, who is currently managing the U21 squad of Gent.

His last former club was OH Leuven in the Belgian First Division B. Before he also worked at Genk, where he was fired after coaching only one match, following a 1–3 season-opening defeat to KV Mechelen. Ferrera has managed a number of clubs across various countries and continents (mostly in Belgium, but also including Greece, Luxembourg, Saudi Arabia and a short stint in Mexico), having started his coaching career in his twenties. For example, he led Club América ad interim in the 1995 Mexican football season aged only 27 at the time.

Personal life
Emilio Ferrera was born in Schaerbeek, Belgium. His family emigrated from the Spanish village El Cerro de Andévalo in 1962. His brothers, Manu and Francisco, and his nephew Yannick, are all football coaches.

References

External links

1967 births
Living people
People from Schaerbeek
Belgian footballers
Belgian people of Spanish descent
Belgian football managers
R.S.C. Anderlecht players
Club América managers
K.S.K. Beveren managers
R.W.D. Molenbeek managers
Lierse S.K. managers
R.W.D.M. Brussels F.C. managers
R.A.A. Louviéroise managers
Club Brugge KV head coaches
Panionios F.C. managers
Xanthi F.C. managers
K.S.C. Lokeren Oost-Vlaanderen managers
K.R.C. Genk managers
S.C. Eendracht Aalst players
Racing Jet Wavre managers
K.V.V. Crossing Elewijt players
F.C.V. Dender E.H. managers
Oud-Heverlee Leuven managers
F91 Dudelange managers
Association football midfielders
Footballers from Brussels